Ganesh Prasad Timilsina  is a Nepalese politician, belonging to the Communist Party of Nepal (Unified Marxist–Leninist). In the 2018 National Assembly election he was elected from the Gandaki Province. He was subsequently appointed as Chairman of National Assembly and sworn on 15 March 2018.

References

See also
Krishna Bahadur Mahara
National Assembly

1960 births
Living people
People from Parbat District
Nepal Communist Party (NCP) politicians
Nepalese Hindus
Speakers of the National Assembly (Nepal)
Members of the National Assembly (Nepal)